Fabricia may refer to: 

 Fabricia (polychaete), a genus of polychaetes in the family Fabriciidae
 Fabricia gens, an ancient Roman family
 Fabricia Adans., a synonym of the plant genus Lavandula (lavender)
 Fabricia Scop., a synonym of the plant genus Alysicarpus (moneywort)

See also
 Fabriciidae, a family of annelid worm
 Fabricio (disambiguation)
 Fabricius, a surname